Treubariaceae is a family of green algae in the order Sphaeropleales.

References

External links

Chlorophyceae families
Sphaeropleales
Monogeneric algae families